Boldecker Land is a municipality in the district of Gifhorn, in Lower Saxony, Germany. It is situated along the river Aller, approx. 12 km east of Gifhorn, and 8 km northwest of Wolfsburg. Its seat is in the village Weyhausen.

Politics

Samtgemeinde council
 CDU 8 Seats
 SPD 9 Seats
 WBL 6 Seats
 BBB 1 Seat

Structure of Boldecker Land

References

External links
Samtgemeinde Boldecker Land

Samtgemeinden in Lower Saxony
Gifhorn (district)